The 2011 ADAC Zurich 24 Hours of Nürburgring was the 39th running of the 24 Hours of Nürburgring. It took place over June 25–26, 2011. 135 out of the 202 starters were classified.

Resume
With Corpus Christi weekend being rather late in 2011 on June 23–26, the 2011 event was held two weeks after the 2011 24 Hours of Le Mans. The first five VLN races of 2011 were won by a factory-entered BMW, a GT3-class Mercedes SLS, a new Ferrari 458, the Hybrid Porsche GT3 and finally an Audi R8 LMS, so at least these five different brands were expected to challenge for the overall win in the 24 hours. In the first qualifying session, the Hankook-sponsored Farnbacher-Ferrari used soft tyres and was about 7 seconds faster than the competitors, lapping at an average speed of over 181 km/h, the fastest since 1983. This earned the team the pole position, but also an extra weight of 25 kg in the pre-race update of the ‘Balance of Performance’. Team Manthey decided to find out in the early stages of the race which class was more effective under the current conditions, entering their four Porsche factory drivers on two yellow and green Porsche 997 GT3: two pilots shared the #11 SP9/GT3-spec ‘R’, which had more power and qualified 8th, two others, the #18 SP7/GT2-class ‘RSR’, which had more downforce, but was only 16th on the grid. After a few hours in changing weather conditions, the team retired the ‘R’ to focus on the ‘RSR’ which already had won three times since 2007. Without any problems, it went on to win its fourth Nürburgring 24 Hours, with a new distance record of 156 laps. Second place was taken by another GT2-spec car, the #1 factory BMW M3 GT which had won in 2010. Five GT3 cars of Audi and Mercedes followed. The SP8/GT2-class #2 Ferrari had run into early problems, but set the fastest race lap in the final hours, finishing 8th and James Glickenhaus’ P4/5 Competizione finished 39th, second in the E1-XP2.
After 2010 Sorg Rennsport took the victory in class SP4 again. Gianvito Rossi, Diego Romanini, Alfredo Varini and Alexander Rappold have been the only team in that class, but as it has been the first 24h race for Rossi and Rappold the 122 laps they did and final 78th place overall have been great result!

Race results
Class winners in bold.

References 

Nürburgring 24 Hours
2011 in German motorsport
June 2011 sports events in Germany